Idle animations are animations within video games that occur when the player character is not performing any actions. They serve to give games personality, as an Easter Egg for the player, or for realism.

History 
One of the earliest games to feature an idle animation was Android Nim in 1978. The androids blink, look around, and seemingly talk to one another until the player gives an order. Another two early examples are Maziacs and The Pharaoh's Curse released in 1983. Idle animations grew in usage throughout the 16 bit era. Incorporating idle animations was done to give personality towards games and their characters  as they are the only in-game actions aside from cutscenes where the characters are free to act independent of the player's input.  The idle animation length and details can depend on interaction between the player and character, such as third person player idle animations are longer to avoid looking robotic on repeated viewing.  In modern 3D games idle animation are done to give realism. For games targeting towards younger audiences the idle animations are more likely to be complex or humorous. In comparison games targeted towards older audiences tend to include more basic idle animations.

Examples 

 Maziacs - The sprite character will tap his feet, blink, and sit down.
 Sonic the Hedgehog - Sonic will impatiently tap his foot when the player does not move.
 Donkey Kong Country 2: Diddy Kong's Quest - Diddy Kong juggles a few balls after a few seconds without input.
 Super Mario 64 - Mario looks around and eventually will fall asleep.
 Grand Theft Auto: San Andreas - Carl "CJ" Johnson will sing songs including "Nuthin' But A'G' Thang" and "My Lovin' (You're Never Gonna Get It)."
 Red Dead Redemption 2 - When left on a horse for a while Arthur Morgan will pet the horse.

References

External links
 Idle animations at Giant Bomb, games with idle animations

Video game development
Animation techniques